Ann Harleman (born October 28, 1945 in Youngstown, Ohio) is an American novelist, scholar, and professor.

Life and career 
Ann Harleman was born in Ohio.  When she was four years old, her family moved to Bethlehem, Pennsylvania where her father worked for Bethlehem Steel. As a child, she wrote mystery stories in the style of the Nancy Drew novels.

Aiming for a career in academia, she earned the B.A. degree at Rutgers University. In 1972, she became the first woman to earn the doctorate in linguistics at Princeton, and taught linguistics at the University of Washington.  In 1976, she took part in a six-month exchange program in Russia.

After she moved to Rhode Island in 1983, she became a visiting scholar at Brown's American Civilization department and later a lecturer at the Rhode Island School of Design.

In 1988 she earned the M.F.A. in creative writing at Brown University and began to write short stories, submitting some annually for the Iowa Short Fiction contest. In 1994, her collection of short stories, Happiness, won the Iowa Short Fiction Award.

Personal life 
Harleman married folklore scholar Bruce Rosenberg in 1981. He was diagnosed with multiple sclerosis in 1990 and died in 2010.

Works 
Harleman is the author of the story collections Thoreau’s Laundry and Happiness, and the novels The Year She Disappeared and Bitter Lake.

 The Cost of Anything, 1988 (thesis submitted at Brown University)
 Mute Phone Calls, by Ruth Zernova (translated from Russian), 1991
 Happiness: Stories, 1994 (reprinted 2008)
 Bitter Lake: A Novel, 1996
 Thoreau’s Laundry: Stories, 2007
 The Year She Disappeared: A Novel, 2008

Non-fiction
 Graphic Representation of Models in Linguistic Theory, 1976 (as Ann Harleman Stewart)
 Ian Fleming: A Critical Biography, 1989 (co-authored with Bruce A. Rosenberg)

Articles
 "Kenning and Riddle in Old English." Papers on Language and Literature, vol. 15, issue 2 (spring 1979): 115–136
 "The Solution to Old English Riddle 4." Studia Philologica, vol. 78 (1981)
 "The Role of Narrative Structure in the Transmission of Ideas", in Textual Dynamics of the Professions, 1991

Honors and awards 
Harleman has received numerous awards including the Guggenheim and Rockefeller fellowships, the Berlin Prize in Literature, the Iowa Short Fiction Award, the PEN Syndicated Fiction Award, and the O. Henry Award.

 Guggenheim Fellowship, 1976
 Raymond Carver Prize, 1986
 Chris O’Malley Fiction Prize, 1987
 Chicago Tribune Nelson Algren Awards, 1987
 NEH Fellow, Institute for Literary Translation, 1988
 Rockefeller Foundation Artist’s Fellow, 1989
 Judith Siegel Pearson Award, 1991
 PEN Syndicated Fiction Award, 1991
 Iowa Short Fiction Award, 1993
 Berlin Prize in Literature, 2000
 Zoetrope All-Story Short Fiction Prize, 2002
 O. Henry Award, 2003
 Goodheart Prize for Fiction, 2004
 Rona Jaffe Foundation Writers' Award, 2004

References

External links 
 Official website
 Iowa Short Fiction Award citation, with link to full text of "Happiness"
 Full text of "Textual Dynamics of the Professions" (PDF)

Princeton University alumni
American women novelists
21st-century American novelists
20th-century American novelists
Brown University alumni
1945 births
Living people
20th-century American women writers
21st-century American women writers
Rona Jaffe Foundation Writers' Award winners